Peregrine Bingham may refer to
Peregrine Bingham the elder (1754–1826), English biographer and poet
Peregrine Bingham the younger  (1788–1864), English legal writer